The Urechioiu is a left tributary of the river Sitna in Romania. It flows into the Sitna near Cervicești-Deal.

References

Rivers of Romania
Rivers of Botoșani County